Florida state elections in 2020 were held on Tuesday, November 3, 2020. Aside from its presidential primaries held on March 17, its primary elections were held on August 18, 2020.

In addition to the U.S. presidential race, Florida voters elected all of its seats to the U.S. House of Representatives, one seat on the Florida Supreme Court, 25 of 65 seats on the Florida District Courts of Appeal, all of the seats of the Florida House of Representatives, and 21 of 40 seats in the Florida Senate. Six ballot measures were also voted on. Neither of the state's two U.S. Senate seats were up for election in 2020.

To vote by mail, registered Florida voters had to request a ballot by October 24, 2020. As of early October some 5,547,170 voters have requested mail ballots.

Federal offices

President of the United States

Florida has 29 electoral votes in the Electoral College. Donald Trump won all of them with 51% of the popular vote. The following people filed for presidency candidacy:

United States House of Representatives

There are 26 U.S. Representatives in Florida that were up for election in addition to two seats opened by retirements and one opened after the incumbent, Ross Spano, lost renomination in its Republican primary. 16 Republicans and 11 Democrats were returned. The Republican Party gained two districts, the 26th and the 27th.

State offices

State Judiciary
A retention election occurred for one of seven seats on the Supreme Court of Florida. The incumbent, Carlos G. Muñiz, filed for re-election. He won another 6-year term with 66% of the votes.

State Legislature
All 120 seats of the Florida House of Representatives and 21 of 40 seats of the Florida Senate are up for election. The outcome of this election could affect partisan balance during post-census redistricting.

State Senate

20 out of 40 seats were up for election in the state Senate with one special election. Before the election the composition of the state Senate was:

After the election, the composition was:

House of Representatives

All 120 seats in the state House were up for election. Before the election the composition of the state House was:

After the election, the composition was:

Ballot measures
To pass, any state constitutional amendment requires 60% of the vote.

Amendment 1 

Citizen Requirement for Voting Initiative would enshrine in the state constitution the exclusivity of voting rights for U.S. Citizens.

Amendment 2 

$15 Minimum Wage Initiative would alter the state's constitution to guarantee a gradual raise of the minimum wage to $15 per hour by 2026.

Amendment 3 

Top-Two Open Primaries Initiative would implement the contemporary Californian primary system, opening primaries to all votes regardless of party registration, placing candidates of all parties on the same ballot and advancing the first-place and second-place finishers to the General Election regardless of party affiliation. In addition, if only two candidates filed for the primary, this system would cancel the primary and automatically send them to the General Election.

Amendment 4 

Require Constitutional Amendments to be Passed Twice would require that any further amendments would need to succeed in two different elections to be ratified.

Amendment 5 

Extend "Save Our Homes" Portability Period Amendment would increase the period during which a person may transfer "Save Our Homes" benefits to a new homestead property from two years to three years.

Amendment 6 

Homestead Property Tax Discount for Spouses of Deceased Veterans Amendment would allow a homestead property tax discount to be transferred to the surviving spouse of a deceased veteran.

Polling 
The highlighted result in any poll is whichever is closer to its threshold (40% for 'against' and 60% for 'for' with respect to a given amendment).

 Amendment 1

 Amendment 2

 Amendment 3

 Amendment 4

 Amendment 5

 Amendment 6

See also
 Elections in Florida
 Bilingual elections requirement for Florida (per Voting Rights Act Amendments of 2006)
 Politics of Florida
 Political party strength in Florida
 Florida Democratic Party
 Republican Party of Florida
 Government of Florida

Notes

Partisan clients

References

Further reading

External links
 Division of Elections - Florida Department of State
 Florida Elections Commission government website
  (State affiliate of the U.S. League of Women Voters)
 
 
 
 
 . (Guidance to help voters get to the polls; addresses transport, childcare, work, information challenges)
 . ("Deadlines, dates, requirements, registration options and information on how to vote in your state")

 
Florida